Ewing is an unincorporated community and census-designated place (CDP) in Lee County, Virginia. The population was 439 at the 2010 U.S. Census. Ewing is one of the westernmost settlements in the Commonwealth of Virginia, before reaching the Cumberland Gap and the borders with Kentucky and Tennessee.

The Ewing post office was established in 1891.

Ewing is home to Thomas Walker High School and the Lincoln Memorial University Veterinarian Teaching and Research Center.

Geography
Ewing is located in western Lee County at  (36.640738, −83.431908). U.S. Route 58 passes through the center of town, leading east  to Jonesville, the Lee county seat, and west  to Cumberland Gap, Tennessee.

Ewing is in the valley of Indian Creek, which flows west-southwest to join the Powell River in Tennessee.

Demographics
As of the census of 2000, there were 436 people, 183 households, and 127 families residing in the CDP. The population density was 112.4 people per square mile (43.4/km2). There were 216 housing units at an average density of 55.7/sq mi (21.5/km2). The racial makeup of the CDP was 99.31% White, 0.23% from other races, and 0.46% from two or more races. Hispanic or Latino of any race were 0.23% of the population.

There were 183 households, out of which 32.2% had children under the age of 18 living with them, 54.6% were married couples living together, 12.0% had a female householder with no husband present, and 30.1% were non-families. 27.9% of all households were made up of individuals, and 13.1% had someone living alone who was 65 years of age or older. The average household size was 2.38 and the average family size was 2.91.

In the CDP, the population was spread out, with 25.5% under the age of 18, 6.9% from 18 to 24, 24.8% from 25 to 44, 26.4% from 45 to 64, and 16.5% who were 65 years of age or older. The median age was 40 years. For every 100 females, there were 87.9 males. For every 100 females age 18 and over, there were 84.7 males.

The median income for a household in the CDP was $22,292, and the median income for a family was $30,278. Males had a median income of $26,154 versus $23,250 for females. The per capita income for the CDP was $11,722. About 20.3% of families and 27.1% of the population were below the poverty line, including 4.5% of those under age 18 and 42.7% of those age 65 or over.

References

External links

Census-designated places in Lee County, Virginia
Census-designated places in Virginia